Bukit Batok Central is a subzone of Bukit Batok. It is bounded by Bukit Batok West Avenue 6/3, Central, East Avenue 3/6.

Housing estates

Politics
It is part of the Bukit Batok constituency since 2015. Along with their neighbouring Bukit Batok East, Yuhua and Hong Kah (Jurong East/West), it was one of the founding constituencies for Jurong GRC in 2001.

Neighbouring Areas

References

External links

Places in Singapore
Roads in Singapore
Bukit Batok